Bad Hat Harry Productions is an American film and television production company founded in 1994 by director Bryan Singer. It has produced such films as The Usual Suspects and the X-Men film series, as well as the television series House. The name is an  homage to Steven Spielberg and comes from a line uttered by Roy Scheider in the 1975 feature Jaws: an elderly swimmer in a bathing cap teases police chief Martin Brody about not going in the water; Brody replies, "That's some bad hat, Harry." The original 2004 logo paid animated homage to this scene. The current logo, introduced in 2011, is taken from the police lineup scene of The Usual Suspects.

Filmography

Television

Critical reception

References

Mass media companies established in 1994
Film production companies of the United States
Television production companies of the United States